Deep Blue is the debut collaborative studio album by Mark Peters of Engineers and Elliot Ireland, released on 4 September 2015, through Pedigree Cuts, a label that boasts Peters' Engineers bandmate, Ulrich Schnauss, on its roster.

In 2016, the track Deep Blue was used in the soundtrack for Realive, a science fiction film written and directed by Mateo Gil.

Following the album, the duo released Deep Blue Remixes in October 2016, featuring reworkings of album tracks including Ulrich Schnauss, Arovane and more.

Track listing
All songs written and composed by Mark Peters & Elliot Ireland.

Personnel

Mark Peters: Vocals, guitars. bass on all songs except 8. Sampler/programming on 1, 2, 3, 4, 8, 10, 11. Synth on 6 and 9.
Elliot Ireland: Guitar on 3, 6, 11, 12. Bass on 8. Piano on 2, 3, 5, 7, 8, 9, 10, 11. Clarinet on 3 and 9. Synth on 11. Ukulele on 12. Whistling on 9.

Additional musicians
Sophie McDonnell: Vocals on 1, 2, 4, 6 and 8.
Dan Hewson: Electric piano and piano on 1 and 8.
Flavio Carvalho: Drums on all songs except 5, 11 and 12.
Shawn Lee: Drums on 5.

Producers
Produced, recorded and mixed by Mark Peters and Elliot Ireland at Mark's home in York and Pedigree Cuts Studios, London.

References

External links
Album listing on EMI Publishing website

2015 debut albums